Shane Nicholson may refer to:
 Shane Nicholson (footballer)
 Shane Nicholson (singer)